Augusta Fox Bronner (July 22, 1881 – December 11, 1966) was an American psychologist, best known for her work in juvenile psychology. She co-directed the first child guidance clinic, and her research shaped psychological theories about the causes behind child delinquency, emphasizing the need to focus on social and environmental factors over inherited traits.

Early life 
Bronner was born July 22, 1881, in Louisville, Kentucky, to Gustave Bronner and Hanna Fox Bronner. The family was Jewish, and Augusta Fox Bronner's grandparents on both sides of the family were originally from Germany. She had two siblings, an older brother and a younger sister.

After living in Cincinnati for several years, Bronner's family returned to Louisville, where Bronner graduated with her high school diploma in 1898.

Education 
Bronner's mother and grandmother both encouraged her to study and build a career. Bronner had aspired to be a teacher since youth, and after high school she pursued an educator's certification at the Louisville Normal School. She dropped out briefly, due to eye problems, and spent a year travelling in Europe with her aunt before returning to the Normal School and graduating in 1901.

After enrolling in the Columbia University Teachers College, Bronner completed her bachelor's degree (B.S.) in 1906, soon followed by her master's degree (A.M.) in 1909. During her studies, she worked part-time grading papers for psychologist Edward L. Thorndike. She returned to Louisville briefly, teaching at the local Louisville Girls' High School – her old school – until her father's death in 1911. Bonner then began her doctoral studies at the Teachers' College, working with Thorndike.

In 1914, Bronner completed her doctoral degree and published her dissertation, entitled A Comparative Study of the Intelligence of Delinquent Girls. Bronner's research showed that there was no correlation between delinquency and mental disability, undermining the common notion of the time that criminal behaviour was passed down through biological factors.

Career 
In 1913, while taking a summer course at Harvard University, Bronner met Chicago neurologist and professor William Healy. Healy was equally interested in the study of child delinquency, and subsequently hired Bronner to work as a psychologist at his Chicago Juvenile Psychopathic Institute. In 1914, the institute was renamed the Psychopathic Clinic of the Juvenile Court, and Bronner soon became the assistant director. Bronner and Healy proceeded to shape the study and treatment of delinquent youth, contributing to the scientific understanding that most juvenile crime stemmed from "mental repressions, social conflicts, and family relations", not hereditary factors. Among other research, Bronner identified that delinquency often arose as a result of placing children with learning disabilities or special abilities in the wrong kinds of educational environments.

In 1917, Bronner and Healy took up new positions at the Judge Baker Foundation of Boston (later the Judge Baker Children's Center), a new publicly funded child guidance clinic attached to the Boston juvenile court. Bronner handled most of the psychological examinations of youth, as well as interviews with girls and the youngest children. In 1927, Bronner and Healy wrote the influential Manual of Individual Mental Tests and Testing, a comprehensive guide to assessing a patient's mental state. Although Healy was originally given the full position of director, with Bronner acting as assistant director, Bronner eventually became co-director of the Foundation in 1930. The Judge Baker Foundation soon became a model for other child guidance clinics across the country, with its co-directors developing important psychiatric practices such as the "team" method, in which psychologists worked together with social workers and physicians to treat a patient.

On November 19, 1930, Bronner and Healy were invited by President Herbert Hoover to attend the White House Conference on Child Health and Protection.

During the 1930s, Bronner also worked briefly in New Haven, Connecticut, as Director of the short-lived Research Institute of Human Relations at Yale University. She was president of the American Orthopsychiatric Association in 1932.

Publications 
After her dissertation, Bronner published The psychology of special abilities and disabilities in 1917. It was reprinted multiple times, helping to boost the vocational testing movement. Her 1916 article "Attitude as It Affects Performances of Tests" was well-cited by others in subsequent research, exploring how certain factors could affect test results.

As her personal and professional relationship with William Healy grew, Bronner retreated from publishing her individual work, preferring to co-write with Healy. In collaboration with Healy, Bronner published multiple books on juvenile psychology, including Reconstructing behavior in youth: A study of problem children in foster families (1929), Treatment and what happened afterward (1939), and What makes a child delinquent? (1948).

Personal life and retirement 
In September 1932, after Healy's wife died, he and Bronner finally married. According to biographer John C. Burnham, marriage changed very little about their professional relationship, its only effects being the easier facilitation of their working together on evenings and weekends and "complicating administration of the clinic" whenever the couple went on vacation together.

A shortage of staff during World War II prolonged Bronner and Healy's work at the Judge Baker Foundation, despite retirement plans. After the couple finally retired in 1946, Bronner destroyed most of her own personal research and unpublished papers, preferring to keep the public's focus on her husband's academic work. Bronner and Healy spent their retirement in Clearwater, Florida.

Death 
Bronner died in Clearwater on December 11, 1966.

References

1881 births
1966 deaths
American women psychologists
20th-century American psychologists
Child psychologists
Teachers College, Columbia University alumni
People from Louisville, Kentucky